Esther Kolb Walling (April 7, 1940 – February 1, 2017) was a former member of the Wisconsin State Assembly.

Biography
Walling was born on April 7, 1940, in Winnebago County, Wisconsin. She graduated from Oshkosh High School in Oshkosh, Wisconsin, as well as the University of Wisconsin–Oshkosh. Walling was married with two children. She was a realtor. Walling died on February 1, 2017, from cancer.

Career
Walling served in the Wisconsin Assembly from 1983 to 1989. Previously, she was Clerk of the Town of Menasha, Wisconsin from 1975 to 1977 and town chairperson  from 1977 to 1981. She is a Republican.

References

Politicians from Oshkosh, Wisconsin
Mayors of places in Wisconsin
Republican Party members of the Wisconsin State Assembly
Women state legislators in Wisconsin
Women mayors of places in Wisconsin
University of Wisconsin–Oshkosh alumni
Businesspeople from Wisconsin
1940 births
2017 deaths
Deaths from cancer in Wisconsin
20th-century American businesspeople
20th-century American women
21st-century American women